Kamakahelei (c. 18th century - 1794), was alii nui, or Queen regnant, of the island of Kauai. She was the ruling chiefess of Kauai reigning from 1770 - 1794. In some historical references she has been described as a regent for her sons Keawe and Kaumualii. She was the sovereign of the Island of Kauai at the time Captain James Cook landed on its shores. The Chiefess Kamakahelei Middle School in the district of Puhi is named after her. This school serves the Kalaheo to Hanamaulu districts on the island of Kauai.

Biography
Kamakahelei was one of three daughters of High Chief Kaumeheiwa, the son of High Chief Lonoikahaupu and High Chiefess Kamuokaumeheiwa, and his wife, High Chief Kaapuwai, possibly the daughter of Peleioholani, Alii nui of Oahu and Alii nui of Kauai. According to tradition, her grandfather Lonoikahaupu was five generations in descent from the 13th Alii Aimoku of Kauai, Kalanikukuma. His family had traditionally ruled in Waimea and the south-western section of the island, although always in subordination to the elder line of Kauaian chiefs. It is unclear why Kamakahelei succeeded Peleioholani as the Alii of Kauai. It is not certain that she was his granddaughter or a close relative. The legends remain silent between the transaction of rule between the two dynasties.

She first married Kaneoneo, Peleioholani's grandson and the pretender to the throne of Oahu of the Kualii line. He had rights to the succession to Kauai, but it is not known if he contended with his wife over the rule of the island. Kaneoneo's father, Kūmahana, was deposed by the Ewa chiefs, who replaced him with Kahahana. The latter was the last king of Oahu.

She and her first husband had two daughters: Lelemahoalani and Kapuaamohu. Kaneoneo died during the rebellion on Oahu against Mauian King Kahekili II in the year 1785 or 86.

Kamakahelei next married Kaeokulani, a prince of Maui and brother of Kahekili II. They had a son Kaumualii. Together they united rule of the island of Niihau, her husband's domain, and the Island of Kauai.

Successors 
After Kamakahelei's death in 1794, her husband Kaeokulani may have briefly taken regency over his son as he did his nephew Kalanikūpule's inheritance of Maui. Kaeokulani died the same year, killed at the Battle of Kukiiahu, at Kalauao, Oahu on December 12, 1794. Her son continued to ruled the kingdom of Kauai independently until he consented to becoming a vassal of Kamehameha the Great.

References

1794 deaths
Niihau
Royalty of Kauai and Niihau
Year of birth uncertain
Hawaiian queens regnant
18th-century monarchs in Oceania
18th-century women rulers